Sizophila Sabelo Maseko (born 3 March 1991) is a South African rugby union player, who most recently played with the . His regular position is winger.

Career

Youth

He also represented the  team in the 2008 and 2009 Under-19 Provincial Championship competition.

He joined  in 2010 and played for their Under-19 team in the Under-19 Provincial Championship competition. He was named in their squad for the 2011 Vodacom Cup, but did not make an appearance. He was named in the  squad for the 2012 Varsity Cup competition, but also failed to make an appearance for them.

He then joined Durban-based side  and represented their U21 side in the 2012 Under-21 Provincial Championship.

Sharks

His first team debut came in the 2013 Vodacom Cup. He started all eight matches in the competition and weighed in with a further three tries.

His Currie Cup debut came later in the same year, when he was included in the Sharks starting team to face  in the opening match of the 2013 Currie Cup Premier Division season.

Leopards

He joined Potchefstroom-based side the  during the 2015 Currie Cup qualification tournament. He was a member of the  team that won the 2015 Currie Cup First Division. He featured in a total of seven matches during the qualification rounds and First Division proper and scored one try for the side.

References

South African rugby union players
Living people
1991 births
People from Ermelo, Mpumalanga
Sharks (Currie Cup) players
Rugby union wings
Rugby union players from Mpumalanga